ACM International Collegiate Programming Contest (abbreviated as ACM-ICPC or just ICPC) is an annual multi-tiered competition among the universities of the world. There are eighteen different sites in Asia that host Asia Regional Final and Dhaka is one of them. Each year the winner of the Asia Regional Final Dhaka Site Contest advances to the ACM-ICPC World Finals. Like other sites of ICPC, Dhaka site contest is also sponsored by IBM and operated under the auspices of the Association for Computing Machinery (ACM).

History 

ACM ICPC Dhaka site contest started in 1997 with the initiative of Professor A. L. Haque of North South University (NSU). Its first event was held on 18 November 1997 with the participation of 18 teams from 11 institutions. Bangladesh University of Engineering and Technology - BUET Bengal Tigers team became the champion and moved to the world final which was held on 28 February 1998 at Atlanta, Georgia, United States. Champion BUET team of Suman Kumar Nath (now at Microsoft Research), Rezaul Alam Chowdhury (UT Austin) and Tarique Mesbaul Islam (Waterloo) occupied 24th position in the world final among 54 teams tying with Stanford University. Same year, NSU team received a wild card for being the host of the Dhaka site regional contest and participated in the world final.

North South University hosted this event 12 times from 1997 to 1999, 2004 to 2006, 2008 to 2011, 2013 and 2015 while Bangladesh University of Engineering and Technology hosted thrice from 2001 to 2003. East West University hosted the event in 2007. Daffodil International University hosted the event in 2012. Bangladesh University of Business and Technology hosted the event in 2014.

Past events

1997 

 Champion: Bangladesh University of Engineering and Technology
 Host: North South University
 Champion's position at the world final: 24th
 Notes: Bangladesh University of Engineering and Technology also secured 2nd, 3rd and 4th place.

1998 

 Champion: Bangladesh University of Engineering and Technology
 Host: North South University
 Champion's position at the world final: Honorable Mention
 Notes: Bangladesh University of Engineering and Technology also secured 3rd and 4th place. Sharif University of Tehran and IIT Kanpur secured 7th and 11th place respectively.

1999 

 Champion: Chinese University of Hong Kong
 Host: North South University
 Champion's position at the world final: 8th
 Notes: Bangladesh University of Engineering and Technology secured 2nd, 3rd and 4th place.

2000 

 Not Hosted

2001 

 Champion: Bangladesh University of Engineering and Technology
 Host: Bangladesh University of Engineering and Technology
 Champion's position at the world final: Honorable Mention
 Notes: Bangladesh University of Engineering and Technology and American International University-Bangladesh secured 2nd place respectively.

2002 

 Champion: Bangladesh University of Engineering and Technology
 Host: Bangladesh University of Engineering and Technology
 Champion's position at the world final: Honorable Mention
 Notes: Nanyang Technological University of Singapore secured 2nd place.

2003 

 Champion: Fudan University
 Maximum problem solved: 6
 Host: Bangladesh University of Engineering and Technology
 Champion's position at the world final: 15th
 Notes:Bangladesh University of Engineering and Technology secured 2nd and 3rd place. Dhaka University became 4th.

2004 

 Champion:Fudan University
 Maximum problem solved: 6
 Host:North South University
 Champion's position at the world final: 6th
 Notes: Bangladesh University of Engineering and Technology secured 2nd place. National University of Singapore and IIT Bombay secured 3rd and 6th place respectively.

2005 

 Champion:Fudan University
 Maximum problem solved: 6
 Host:North South University
 Champion's position at the world final: 39th
 Notes: Dhaka University and Bangladesh University of Engineering and Technology secured 2nd and 3rd place respectively. American International University - Bangladesh became 4th. Multimedia University of Malaysia received an honorable mention.

2006 

 Champion:RSTU
 Host:North South University
 Champion's position at the world final: 26th
 Notes: Bangladesh University of Engineering and Technology secured 2nd place. American International University - Bangladesh and North South University jointly secured 3rd place.

2007 

 Champion: Bangladesh University of Engineering and Technology
 Host: East West University
 Maximum problem solved: 7
 Champion's position at the world final: 31st
 Notes: Fudan University and East West University secured 2nd and 3rd place respectively. Total 86 Teams from 33 Universities competed to take the pride to qualify for ACM ICPC world final 2008.

2008 

 Champion: Fudan University
 Host: North South University
 Maximum problem solved: 9
 Champion's position at the world final: 14th
 Notes; Bangladesh University of Engineering and Technology secured 2nd place and received wild card for participating in the world finals. A total of 83 teams competed.

2009 

 Champion: Fudan University
 Host: North South University
 Maximum problem solved: 7
 Champion's position at the world final: 11th
 Notes; Bangladesh University of Engineering and Technology secured 2nd place and Dhaka University placed 3rd. A total of 89 teams participated.

2010 

 Champion: Bangladesh University of Engineering and Technology
 Host: North South University
 Maximum problem solved: 6
 Champion's position at the world final: Honorable Mention
 Notes: Fudan University and Bangladesh University of Engineering and Technology secured 2nd and 3rd place respectively. Total 103 Teams from 43 Universities competed for a spot at the ACM ICPC world final 2011.

2011 

 Champion: Bangladesh University of Engineering and Technology
 Host: North South University
 Maximum problem solved: 5
 Champion's position at the world final: Honorable Mention

2012 

 Champion: Shanghai Jiao Tong University
 Host: Daffodil International University
 Maximum problem solved: 7
 Champion's position at the world final: 4th

2013 
 Champion: Shahjalal University of Science and Technology
 Host: North South University
 Maximum problem solved: 7
 Champion's position at the world final: Honorable Mention

2014 
 Champion: Shahjalal University of Science and Technology
 Host: Bangladesh University of Business and Technology
 Maximum problem solved: 7
 Champion's position at the world final:  54

2015 
 Champion: Jahangirnagar University
 Host: North South University
 Maximum problem solved: 7
 Champion's position at the world final:  44

2016 
 Champion: Bangladesh University of Engineering and Technology
 Host: University of Asia Pacific
 Maximum problem solved: 10
 Champion's position at the world final:  Honorable Mention

2017 
 Champion: Bangladesh University of Engineering and Technology
 Host: University of Asia Pacific
 Maximum problem solved: 10
 Champion's position at the world final:  56th

2018 

 Champion: Shahjalal University of Science and Technology
 Host: Daffodil International University
 Maximum problem solved: 6
 Champion's position at the world final:  HM

2019 

 Champion: Bangladesh University of Engineering and Technology
 Host: Southeast University
 Maximum problem solved: 8
 Champion's position at the world final:  24th (Asia West Champions)

Dhaka site local teams in the world final 

Each year at least one local team from Dhaka site takes part in the world final either as the regional champion or by wild card. On few occasions Dhaka site local teams made it by winning ACM ICPC Kanpur site regional. In 2005, Fudan University became champion at two different sites and withdrawn their championship from Dhaka site. As a result, 2nd ranked team, University of Dhaka who was supposed to get a wild card got the direct entry to the world final and Bangladesh University of Engineering and Technology got the wild card. Summary of all the Dhaka site local team results in the world final are illustrated in the following table:

ACM ICPC Dhaka site hosts

Host Universities 

 1997 - North South University
 1998 - North South University
 1999 - North South University
 2000 - Not hosted
 2001 - Bangladesh University of Engineering and Technology
 2002 - Bangladesh University of Engineering and Technology
 2003 - Bangladesh University of Engineering and Technology
 2004 - North South University
 2005 - North South University
 2006 - North South University
 2007 - East West University
 2008 - North South University
 2009 - North South University
 2010 - North South University
 2011 - North South University
 2012 - Daffodil International University
 2013 - North South University
 2014 - Bangladesh University of Business and Technology
 2015 - North South University
 2016 - University of Asia Pacific
 2017 - University of Asia Pacific
 2018 - Daffodil International University
 2019 - Southeast University

See also

 List of computer science awards

References

External links 

 ACM ICPC Dhaka Site Home page from Baylor University server
 Dhaka Site Home page for 2004-06 and 2008-10, North South University
 ACM ICPC 2007 Dhaka Site Home page from East West University server
 Hall of Champion, ACM ICPC

Programming contests
Computer science competitions